The Kern River Oil Field is a large oil field in Kern County in the San Joaquin Valley of California, north-northeast of Bakersfield in the lower Sierra foothills. It had 9,183 active wells, the second highest in the state. The principal operator on the field is Chevron Corporation

Geographic setting

This area is the densest operational oil development in the state of California: Midway-Sunset, which has more wells, is almost three times as large in surface area, for a lower overall density.

The oil field is one of many contiguous oil fields along the eastern edge of the southern San Joaquin Valley, lying between the Kern Front field to the northwest and the Kern Bluff field to the southeast, on the other side of the Kern River.  Directly north of the Kern River field is the large Mount Poso Oil Field, entirely in the Sierra foothills, and to the northeast is the Round Mountain Oil Field.

Geology

Unlike some of the other Kern County oil fields which contain numerous pools, the Kern River field has one large pool, named for the field itself (the Kern River) and two smaller pools, the Vedder and Jewett, discovered in 1981 and 1985 respectively.

The granitic basement rocks were of late Jurassic age.

History and operations

On June 1, 1899,  feet to the north, Horace and Milton McWhorter drilled this region's first commercial well."

The current operator of the Kern River Field is Chevron, who has gradually acquired the field through buyout and merger with the various other operators, including Tidewater, one of the original developers of the enhanced production technologies that revived the field in the 1960s; Getty Oil; and Texaco.

While most of the oil has been removed from the field, enhanced production technologies such as steam flooding have made it possible to extract much of the oil once considered unfeasible to recover. A high price of oil also makes recovery of previously marginal pools attractive.

Annual oil production from the field was 70,000 bbd/d as of 2014.

Wastewater from the field was once allowed to drain directly into the streams dissecting the region, and thence into the Kern River.  This practice ended in the 1960s and 1970s when more stringent environmental regulations were enacted both on federal and state levels.  Wastewater now is treated in facilities specifically built for this purpose, and after the treatment, is used to irrigate crops in the San Joaquin Valley.

California Historical Landmark

 Discovery well of Kern River Oilfield California State Historical Landmark reads:

NO. 290 DISCOVERY WELL OF KERN RIVER OILFIELD - Oil was discovered at 70 feet in 1899, when Tom Means persuaded Roe Elwood and Frank Wiseman, aided by Jonathan, Bert, Jed, and Ken Elwood, George Wiseman, and John Marlowe, to dig here for oil. On June 1, 1899, 400 feet to the north, Horace and Milton McWhorter drilled this region's first commercial well.

See also
 California Historical Landmarks in Kern County
California Historical Landmark

References
On-site California Historical Marker .
 California Oil and Gas Fields, Volumes I, II and III.  Vol. I (1998), Vol. II (1992), Vol. III (1982).  California Department of Conservation, Division of Oil, Gas, and Geothermal Resources (DOGGR).  1,472 pp.  Kern River Oil Field information is on pp. 232–233. PDF file available on CD from www.consrv.ca.gov.
 California Department of Conservation, Oil and Gas Statistics, Annual Report, December 31, 2006.

Notes

External links
100 Years of Oil, from the Bakersfield Californian:  stories about local oilfields including the Kern River

Oil fields in Kern County, California
Kern River
Geography of the San Joaquin Valley